Madiga Reservation Porata Samiti or MRPS is a not-for profit organisation formed to demand the categorisation of the SC reservation quota in Andhra Pradesh and states of India to ensure equitable distribution of state allocations for all the constituent Dalit castes, including the Madiga. It was formed under the leadership of  kalva ravi madiga in 1994 and is currently headed by

References

Human rights organisations based in India